Maxim is an unincorporated community located within Howell Township in Monmouth County, New Jersey, United States. The area, just southwest of the Squankum takes its name from the Maxim Powder Company and its founder, Hudson Maxim, who developed a plant there in 1890.

References

Neighborhoods in Howell Township, New Jersey
Unincorporated communities in Monmouth County, New Jersey
Unincorporated communities in New Jersey